Woodmen Hall may refer to:
 Woodmen Hall (Stuart, Florida)
 Woodmen Hall (Saint Onge, South Dakota)

See also
 W.O.W. Hall (Woodmen of the World Hall), in Eugene, Oregon, U.S.
 Woodmen of Union Building, in Hot Springs, Arkansas, U.S.

Architectural disambiguation pages